Kalateh-ye Siah Dasht (also Romanized as Kalāteh-ye Sīāh Dasht; also known as Sīāh Dasht and Stah Dasht) is a village in Shah Jahan Rural District, in the Central District of Faruj County, North Khorasan Province, Iran. At the 2006 census, its population was 626, in 170 families.

References 

Populated places in Faruj County